Roncegno Terme (Ronzégno in local dialect) is a comune (municipality) in Trentino in the northern Italian region Trentino-Alto Adige/Südtirol, located about  east of Trento.

References

External links
 Official website 

Cities and towns in Trentino-Alto Adige/Südtirol